I Know That You Know That I Know is a 1982 Italian comedy-drama film directed by Alberto Sordi, who is also the co-protagonist with the Italian actress Monica Vitti. It was entered into the 13th Moscow International Film Festival where it won a Special Prize. The film's sets were designed by the art directors Lorenzo Baraldi and Massimo Tavazzi. It was shot on location around Rome.

Cast
 Alberto Sordi as Fabio Bonetti
 Monica Vitti as Livia Bonetti
 Isabella De Bernardi as Veronica Bonetti
 Salvatore Jacono as Cavalli
 Giuseppe Mannajuolo as The Detective
 Ivana Monti as Valeria
 Micaela Pignatelli as Elena Vitali
 Claudio Gora as Ronconi
 Pier Francesco Aiello as Marco
 Napoleone Scrugli as Mirko
 Cesare Cadeo as Reporter
 Sandro Paternostro as himself
 Gianni Letta as himself

References

External links
 

1982 films
1982 comedy-drama films
Italian comedy-drama films
1980s Italian-language films
Films directed by Alberto Sordi
Films scored by Piero Piccioni
Films shot in Rome
Films set in Rome
1982 comedy films
1982 drama films
1980s Italian films